Quincy Township is one of twelve townships in Adams County, Iowa, USA.  At the 2010 census, its population was 1779.

Geography
According to the USGS, it contains five cemeteries: Oakland, Old Queen City, Queen City, Quincy and Walnut Grove.

References

External links
 US-Counties.com
 City-Data.com

Townships in Adams County, Iowa
Townships in Iowa